Rei Ujkashi (born 28 June 1994) is an Albanian professional footballer who played for FC Kevitan in the Albanian Second Division.

References

1994 births
Living people
Footballers from Tirana
Albanian footballers
Association football midfielders
Association football forwards
KF Tirana players
FC Kamza players
KF Elbasani players
FC Kevitan players
Kategoria Superiore players
Kategoria e Dytë players